Gateway National Recreation Area is a   U.S. National Recreation Area in New York City and Monmouth County, New Jersey. It provides recreational opportunities that are not commonly found in a dense urban environment, including ocean swimming, bird watching, boating, hiking and camping. Ten million people visit Gateway annually.

Gateway was created by the U.S. Congress in 1972 to preserve and protect scarce or unique natural, cultural, and recreational resources with relatively convenient access by a high percentage of the nation's population. It is owned by the federal government and managed by the National Park Service.

Creation 
In 1969, the Regional Plan Association proposed a new national seashore in the New York metropolitan area, to be administered by the United States Department of the Interior. U.S. President Richard Nixon put his support behind a very similar proposal in 1970, with one significant change: instead of being designated a "seashore", the protected area would be a national park. In May of that year, the president started the process of getting Congressional approval for this move.

The United States House of Representatives approved the creation of Gateway National Recreation Area in September 1972, and most of the land was transferred to the National Park Service (NPS) for inclusion in Gateway National Recreation Area. In the same vote, the House denied the state's provision to create a housing development at Floyd Bennett Field, which was to be part of the Gateway Area. Gateway National Recreation Area was officially created on October 27, 1972, along with Golden Gate National Recreation Area in San Francisco. This excluded some of the land proposed by the RPA, including the Coney Island shore.

Units and park sites 
The recreation area comprises three units and 11 park sites in all. Primary law enforcement in the Gateway National Recreation Area is the responsibility of the United States Park Police in the New York units, and National Park Service Rangers in the New Jersey unit.

Jamaica Bay Unit 
Jamaica Bay Unit, in Brooklyn and Queens, includes much of the shoreline and water below the Shore Parkway beginning at Plum Beach and ending at John F. Kennedy International Airport, along with several dozen islands in Jamaica Bay, a tidal estuary. It also includes most of the western part of the Rockaway Peninsula, which separates Jamaica Bay from the Atlantic Ocean. Among the sites in this unit are:
Jamaica Bay Wildlife Refuge is a prime location for viewing birds and bird migrations, diamondback turtle egg-laying and horseshoe crab mating and egg laying. Its  are mostly open water, but includes upland shoreline and islands with salt marsh, dunes, brackish ponds, woodland, and fields. It is the only "wildlife refuge" in the National Park System. Originally created and managed by New York City as a "wildlife refuge", the term was retained by Gateway when the site was transferred. All other federally managed areas titled "wildlife refuge" are managed by the U.S. Fish & Wildlife Service under their own specific criteria and standards.
 Shirley Chisholm State Park is a park built on top of the former Pennsylvania Ave landfill along the belt parkway in the north of the bay. The park is operated by the New York State Office of Parks, Recreation and Historic Preservation, but the land is owned by the National Park Service and is leased to the state for a 60 year period. The park represents an innovative step in landfill remediation and redevelopment, and has cost 20 million dollars as of 2019 to develop. The park features bike paths, free bike rentals, kayaking, fishing, and walking trails. The first phase of SCSP was opened in July 2019, and subsequent development will open the other half in 2020.
 Floyd Bennett Field, a decommissioned airfield with a historic district on the National Register of Historic Places, also hosts the Historic Aircraft Restoration Project (H.A.R.P.) in Hangar B where volunteers are working to preserve the park's collection of historic aircraft. Hangar B is open to the public at selected times during the week. Exhibits and programs on the airfield's history are available in the former control tower and terminal, since converted into the Ryan Visitor Center, named for William Fitts Ryan, the congressman who championed Gateway's creation. The former airfield also accommodates public camping, with 46 campsites. As of August 2013, Floyd Bennett Field campground provides hot showers and clean modern bathrooms. There is also a camp store. No electricity provided. Still, it is the only public campground maintained by the National Park Service that is within the limits of an American city, and the only legal campground in New York City. The grasslands of Floyd Bennett Field are a good place for viewing falcons such as kestrels. Floyd Bennett Field also includes concession recreational facilities including a sports arena and ice skating rinks in adaptively re-used hangars. Within this unit, but still nearby, are Dead Horse Bay, which includes a marina concession, and an adjacent golf driving range concession. Bergen Beach, on the north shore of Jamaica Bay, is also nearby and within the unit's boundary, supporting a horse riding academy concession.
 Canarsie Pier is the latest in a series of recreational piers near this location, and remains popular as a picnic area and fishing spot on the north shore of the bay.
 Fort Tilden, between Jacob Riis Park and Breezy Point on the Rockaway peninsula, has some of the city's most pristine and secluded ocean beaches, a successional maritime forest, a coastal dune system, and a freshwater pond. Between 1917 and 1974, Fort Tilden served as part of the harbor's system of defenses, and once housed Nike antiaircraft missiles. Today an observatory deck on one of the old batteries has views of Jamaica Bay, New York Harbor and the Manhattan skyline. Fort Tilden is one of the best places on New York Harbor to observe hawks during the fall migration.
 Breezy Point Tip occupies the westernmost part of the Rockaway peninsula, forming one side of the outer "gateway" to New York Harbor. Its  contain oceanfront beach, bay shoreline, dunes, marshes and coastal grasslands. Breezy Point Tip is a nesting area for the threatened piping plover.
 Jacob Riis Park is an ocean beach with a boardwalk and historic bathhouse with art deco elements. It was built by powerful New York planner and administrator Robert Moses, and was named after journalist, photographer and reformer Jacob Riis.

Staten Island Unit 

The  Staten Island Unit is located on the southeastern shore of Staten Island facing Lower New York Bay. It includes Hoffman and Swinburne Islands, both off limits to visitation and managed primarily for the benefit of avian species. The unit also includes the following three sites:
 Fort Wadsworth is a historic collection of masonry fortifications on the site of much earlier fortifications at the Narrows of New York Bay.
 Miller Field is a historic former airfield south of New Dorp with picnic areas, open areas and sports fields.
 Great Kills Park includes a marina where visitors can go boating, a beach with lifeguards during the summer, and nature trails. It also serves as a nesting site for osprey.

Sandy Hook Unit
Sandy Hook Unit is in Monmouth County in northern New Jersey. The barrier peninsula forms the other side of the "gateway" to New York Harbor, and includes two park sites:
 Fort Hancock served as part of the harbor's coastal defense system from 1895 until 1974 and contains 100 historic buildings and fortifications.
 Sandy Hook contains seven beaches, including Gunnison Beach, a nude beach by custom, as well as salt marshes and a maritime holly forest. Ferries from Manhattan are available in season. Fishing and using hand-launched vessels are popular here.

Gallery

See also 

 Geography of New York–New Jersey Harbor Estuary
 Legacy of parks

References

External links 

 
 Gateway National Recreation Area (National Park Service)
 Gateway National Recreation Area (National Parks of New York Harbor Conservancy)
 Friends of Gunnison official website

 
National Park Service National Recreation Areas
Parks in Queens, New York
Rockaway, Queens
National Park Service areas in New York City
National Park Service areas in New Jersey
Port of New York and New Jersey
Parks in Brooklyn
Parks in Staten Island
Parks in New Jersey
Canarsie, Brooklyn
Raritan Bayshore